Maxx Robert Crosby (born August 22, 1997) is an American football defensive end for the Las Vegas Raiders of the National Football League (NFL). He played college football at Eastern Michigan and was drafted by the Raiders in the fourth round of the 2019 NFL Draft.

Early life
The spelling of Maxx Crosby's first name comes from how large (11 pounds, 9 ounces) he was at birth. He attended Colleyville Heritage High School in Colleyville, Texas.

Crosby's mother, Vera Crosby, is of Serbian origin. He added an eagle emoticon, the Eagles being a nickname both for the Serbian national sports teams, and for their supporter groups.

College career
Crosby played college football at Eastern Michigan from 2015 to 2018. Eastern Michigan was the only college football program to give Crosby an offer. Crosby was selected First-team All-MAC in 2017 and 2018.

Professional career

Oakland / Las Vegas Raiders

2019 season

Crosby was drafted by the Oakland Raiders in the fourth round (106th overall) of the 2019 NFL Draft.

Crosby made his debut in week 1 against the Denver Broncos.  In the game, Crosby made 6 tackles in the 24–16 win.
In week 5 against the Chicago Bears, Crosby recorded his first career sack on Chase Daniel in the 24–21 win.
In week 11 against the Cincinnati Bengals, Crosby sacked Ryan Finley four times, one of which was a strip sack that was recovered by teammate Maurice Hurst Jr. in the 17–10 win, earning AFC Defensive Player of the Week. Crosby's four sacks in a game was the most sacks made by a Raider in a single game since 2015, when Khalil Mack recorded five sacks in a game against the Denver Broncos. In week 17 against the Denver Broncos, Crosby sacked fellow rookie Drew Lock 1.5 times during the 15–16 loss.

2020 season
Crosby was placed on the reserve/COVID-19 list by the team on August 6, 2020, and was activated nine days later.

In Week 3 against the New England Patriots, Crosby recorded his first two sacks of the season on Cam Newton during the 36–20 loss.
In Week 5 against the Kansas City Chiefs, Crosby recorded his first sack on reigning Super Bowl MVP Patrick Mahomes during the 40–32 win.
In Week 17 against the Denver Broncos, Crosby sacked Drew Lock once and blocked two field goals during the 32–31 win.
Crosby was named the AFC Special Teams Player of the Week for his performance.

2021 season
In Week 1, Crosby recorded six tackles, two sacks, and two tackles for loss in a 33–27 win over the Ravens, earning AFC Defensive Player of the Week. In Week 6, Crosby recorded six tackles, 12 pressures, and a season-high three sacks in a 34–24 win over the Denver Broncos. In week 18, Crosby again won AFC Defensive Player of the Week, registering two sacks, six tackles, three tackles for a loss, four quarterback hits, 11 pressures, and three passes defended against the Los Angeles Chargers.

Crosby would set a number of personal bests in the 2021 season, including personal bests in passes defended (7) and quarterback hits (30), more than doubling his career totals up to that point in both statistics, and leading the Raiders in the latter statistic. Crosby also set personal bests for solo tackles, assisted tackles, and combined tackles. Crosby was named second-team All-Pro by the AP.

2022 season
On March 11, 2022, the two-year anniversary of becoming sober, Crosby signed a four-year, $98.98 million contract extension with the Raiders.

Personal life
In March 2020, Crosby checked into rehab for alcoholism. In February 2022, Crosby got engaged to Rachel Washburn, and they welcomed their first child on October 13, 2022.

NFL career statistics

Regular season

References

External links
 Eastern Michigan Eagles bio

1997 births
Living people
American people of Serbian descent
American football defensive ends
Eastern Michigan Eagles football players
Las Vegas Raiders players
Oakland Raiders players
People from Colleyville, Texas
People from Rochester, Michigan
Players of American football from Michigan
Players of American football from Texas
Sportspeople from the Dallas–Fort Worth metroplex
American Conference Pro Bowl players